Albert John Williamson (20 May 1907 – 14 August 1965) was a former Australian rules footballer who played with Carlton and Essendon in the Victorian Football League (VFL).

He was voted "Best First-Year Player" at Essendon in 1929.

Williamson transferred to Camberwell in 1934

Notes

External links 
Jack Williamson's profile at Blueseum

1907 births
1965 deaths
Carlton Football Club players
Essendon Football Club players
Camberwell Football Club players
Australian rules footballers from Victoria (Australia)